The Knoll is a snow-free knoll,  high, surmounting Cape Crozier at the eastern extremity of Ross Island, Antarctica. It was discovered and named by the British National Antarctic Expedition, 1901–04, under Robert Falcon Scott.

References

Hills of Ross Island